Demarius Bolds (born May 6, 1984) is an American professional basketball player for GS Pétroliers. After two years at Missouri Western State University, Bolds entered the 2006 NBA draft but was not selected in the draft's two rounds.

High school career
Bolds played high school basketball at Cahokia High School, in Cahokia, Illinois.

College career
Bolds played college basketball for the Missouri Western Griffons from 2004 to 2006.

Playing career
After going undrafted in the 2006 NBA draft Bolds played for the St. Louis Stunners during 2007–2008 season, as well as the Panevezys Techasas in 2008–2009.

On October 3, 2014, Bolds joined Nift Al-Janoub from Iraq. On February 23, 2015, Bolds left Nift Al-Janoub and joined Al Rayyan of the Qatari Basketball League.

He started the 2015–16 season with Final Gençlik. On December 10, 2015, he signed with Greek team Lavrio. He went on to average 15.9 points, 3.7 rebounds, 1.6 assists and 1.5 steals in 16 games for Lavrio. On April 10, 2016, he signed with Sagesse for the remainder of the season.

On June 19, 2016, Bolds returned to Lavrio, renewing his contract for one more year.

On August 17, 2017, Bolds joined Al Mouttahed Tripoli of the Lebanese Basketball League. On March 27, 2018, Bolds left Al Mouttahed and joined Al Wakrah of the Qatari Basketball League. He finished the season in Bahrain with Al Muharraq.

On July 10, 2018 he joined Kymis of the Greek Basket League. On October 20, 2018, he scored 31 points, grabbed 10 rebounds and gave 3 assists in a loss against Kolossos Rodou. On November 11, 2018, he left Kymis, after being replaced from Reggie Holmes in the team's squad. On November 20, 2018, he joined Champville SC of the Lebanese Basketball League.

On February 21, 2020, Bolds signed with GS Pétroliers in Algeria. However, the season was cancelled due to the COVID-19 pandemic.

References

External links
Profile at eurobasket.com
Profile at realgm.com
Profile at draftexpress.com

1984 births
Living people
American expatriate basketball people in the Czech Republic
American expatriate basketball people in Greece
American expatriate basketball people in Italy
American expatriate basketball people in Kosovo
American expatriate basketball people in Lebanon
American expatriate basketball people in Lithuania
American expatriate basketball people in Qatar
American expatriate basketball people in Turkey
American expatriate basketball people in the United Kingdom
American men's basketball players
Apollon Patras B.C. players
Bashkimi Prizren players
Basketball players from Illinois
BC Kolín players
BC Lietkabelis players
Kymis B.C. players
Lavrio B.C. players
London Lions (basketball) players
Missouri Western Griffons men's basketball players
Shooting guards
Sportspeople from East St. Louis, Illinois
Sagesse SC basketball players